Blind Justice or Excluded to the Public (German: Unter Ausschluß der Öffentlichkeit) is a 1961 West German crime drama film directed by Harald Philipp and starring Peter van Eyck, Marianne Koch and Eva Bartok.

It was shot at the Spandau Studios in Berlin. The film's sets were designed by the art directors Otto Erdmann and Hans Jürgen Kiebach.

Synopsis
While prosecuting a wealthy businessmen accused of murdering his wife so he could marry his younger girlfriend, the state prosecutor is forced to examine the evidence more closely after claims the accused is innocent and his wife committed suicide.

Cast
 Peter van Eyck as Staatsanwalt Dr. Robert Kessler
 Marianne Koch as Ingrid Hansen
 Eva Bartok as Laura Beaumont
 Claus Holm as Dr. Werner Rüttgen
 Wolfgang Reichmann as Alexander Lamas
 Werner Peters as François Lacroix
 Susanne Cramer as Helga Dahms
 Alfred Balthoff as Generalstaatsanwalt Wilhelm Hansen
 Leon Askin as Strafverteidiger Dr. Leupold
 Rudolf Fernau as Generaldirektor Delgasso
 Gudrun Schmidt as Micheline
 Ralf Wolter as Fotograf 
 Heinz Weiss as Staatsanwalt
 Jochen Blume as Französischer Inspektor
 Kurd Pieritz as Müllerburg
 Albert Bessler as Empfangschef
 Herbert Wilk as Vorsitzender des Schwurgerichts
 Peter Schiff as Inspektor Martens
 Heinz Welzel as Dr. Biermann
 Barbara Saade as Frau am Strand
 Kunibert Gensichen as Portier 
 Klaus Dahlen as Paul Kramke 
 Hans Schwarz Jr. as Fremder 
 Heinz Spitzner as Untersuchungsrichter

References

Bibliography 
Hans-Michael Bock and Tim Bergfelder. The Concise Cinegraph: An Encyclopedia of German Cinema. Berghahn Books, 2009.

External links 

1961 films
1961 crime films
German crime films
West German films
1960s German-language films
Films directed by Harald Philipp
German courtroom films
Films shot at Spandau Studios
Bavaria Film films
1960s German films